Paya Lebar MRT station is a Mass Rapid Transit (MRT) interchange station on the East West line (EWL) and Circle line (CCL) in Geylang, Singapore. Despite the name, this station is not located in Paya Lebar but rather along Paya Lebar Road, near the junction with Sims Avenue. It is located among the developments of the Paya Lebar Central commercial hub and near the Geylang Serai district.

The station opened on 4 November 1989 as part of the MRT eastern line extension to Tanah Merah station. The EWL station exterior has the characteristic dome-shaped segmented roof also seen on other elevated EWL stations. The station later interchanges with the Circle line on 17 April 2010, and was the first MRT station to serve both an elevated line and an underground line.

History

East West line

The contract for the construction of Paya Lebar station and associated viaducts was awarded to Lee Kim Tah Ltd. at a contract sum of S$59.52 million in November 1985. The contractor had partnered with a French company Societe Generale D'Enterprises Sainrapt Et Brice (SGE) for the construction. The contract also includes the construction of the Kallang and Aljunied stations. The station opened earlier than expected on 4 November 1989, serving the East West line.

As with most of the above-ground stations along the EWL, the station was built without platform screen doors. Half-height platform screen doors, which prevent commuters from falling onto the train tracks, were installed on 28 October 2011 and commenced operations on 11 January 2012. In addition, high-volume low-speed fans were installed and started operations since 14 July that year together with Kembangan station. Privacy screens were installed at some parts from Paya Lebar Road all the way to Geylang East Central, to minimise the noise impact from residents since October 2016 and completed in May 2017.

Circle line

Contract 823 for the construction of Paya Lebar station was awarded to Lum Chang Building Contractors Pte Ltd-Nishimatsu Construction Co. Ltd. joint venture at a contract sum of S$322 million. The contract also includes the construction of the Mountbatten and Dakota stations. Construction of the station started in August 2002.

On 16 March 2003, several roads around the station, including Paya Lebar Road, Eunos Avenue 5 and Tanjong Katong Road, were converted to one-way traffic to facilitate the construction. A bus stop was also temporary relocated in front of Singapore Post Centre. A stretch of Sims Avenue was also temporarily realigned from 26 August 2003 until two months later. When the roads were reinstated, an extra lane for each direction of Paya Lebar Road was added.

The Circle line station faced a major civil engineering challenge with regard to the underpinning of two existing EWL viaduct pillars. The pillars foundations were obstructing the construction works needed for the station. This was the first time such an operation was conducted in Singapore, especially on a live, heavy-capacity MRT line.  A concrete wall, a concrete beam and a powerful jacking device were used to transfer the load of the viaduct to other structures. It was followed by the removal of the old piles and construction of new piles to support the viaduct. Many monitoring devices were installed and key engineers looked out for any potential breaches. Additional materials and tools were on standby if the pillars start to tilt when the piles were cut, and the Land Transport Authority (LTA) worked out emergency procedures with the Singapore Civil Defence Force (SCDF). The underpinning works were carried out successfully.

The Circle line station opened on 17 April 2010 when the line extended to Dhoby Ghaut station.

Incidents
On 4 April 2007, a man died after being hit by a train along the East West line sector at about 10:20 am. Police said the victim, a 52-year-old Chinese man, was pronounced dead by paramedics at 10:45 am. East-bound services were disrupted for 41 minutes but resumed by 11:02 am.

Station details

Services
The station serves the EWL between the Eunos and Aljunied stations, and the CCL between the Dakota and MacPherson stations. On the EWL, the station operates between 5:47am (6.13am on Sundays and public holidays) and 12:22am. On the CCL, the station operates between 5:40am (6.07am on Sundays and public holidays) and 12:26am.

Design

Like most EWL elevated stations on the eastern segment on the line (after Kallang station), Paya Lebar station has the notable feature of the dome-shaped roof, segmented like a caterpillar, over the platform level. The design was an attempt by the MRT Corporation (MRTC) to give the stations on the EWL an "attractive look".

The CCL station design, like all stations on the line, takes into account certain factors such as safety, comfort and convenience, in addition to giving them a stylish modern outlook. The standardised layouts for the stations also make it simpler for commuters to navigate around. Paya Lebar station is also among the few stations with Y-shaped columns supporting the station structure. In addition, there are barrier-free transfers between the EWL and CCL. The CCL station itself, like the other stations on the line, has features such as lifts and wider faregates to make them accessible for wheelchair users.

Public art

The artwork The Signs of Times by Salleh Japar is showcased at the concourse level of the CCL station as part of the Art-in-Transit programme. The artwork showcases abstract pictographs reflecting the varying periods of Paya Lebar's developments from a rural village to a satellite towns. Some icons used includes pigs in a pig sty and an aeroplane taking flight from a nearby airport.

The station also features Art Seats, which have creative design to enhance the commuters' experience on the line. Two entries were selected through the International Art Seats Design Competition in 2006. The first entry – Matrix, which received the top prize in the international competition – consists of a series of benches engraved with the name of the station in a dot-matrix style on the seat surface. Another entry, Rain, showcases steel seats in the shape of water puddles. These seats are also displayed in the other CCL interchange stations.

Connectivity 
The station is linked directly by underpass to multiple shopping malls in the area, including Paya Lebar Quarter and Paya Lebar Square. Malls and other building in the vicinity that are not linked directly by underpass include SingPost Centre and Lifelong Learning Institute. Exit C on Paya Lebar Road provides access to Foo Hai Ch'an Monastery, Sri Sivan Temple and Masjid Wak Tanjong. Exit D on Paya Lebar Road provides access to City Plaza, Geylang Road and Wisma Geylang Serai.

See also
 Kallang–Paya Lebar Expressway
 Paya Lebar Air Base

References

External links
 

Railway stations in Singapore opened in 1989
Geylang
Mass Rapid Transit (Singapore) stations